The 1994–95 Icelandic Hockey League season was the fourth season of the Icelandic Hockey League, the top level of ice hockey in Iceland. Four teams participated in the league, and Skautafelag Akureyrar won the championship.

Regular season

Final 
 Skautafélag Akureyrar - Ísknattleiksfélagið Björninn 18:7, 11:5

External links 
 1994-95 season

Icelandic Hockey League
Icelandic Hockey League seasons
1994–95 in Icelandic ice hockey